Armuchee High School is a public high school in unincorporated Floyd County, Georgia, United States, with a Rome postal address. It serves grades 7-12 for the Floyd County School District.

Its service area includes the faculty housing of Berry College.

Academics 
The school offers Advanced Placement (AP) classes and students have the option to take postsecondary courses through Georgia Highlands College.

Notable alumni 

Jamie Barton, singer 
Tyler Wilson, Major League Baseball (MLB) pitcher

References

External links 
 
 Floyd County Board of Education

Schools in Floyd County, Georgia
Public high schools in Georgia (U.S. state)
Buildings and structures in Rome, Georgia
Educational institutions established in 1982
1982 establishments in Georgia (U.S. state)